Rosalia batesi is a species of beetle in the family Cerambycidae. It was described by Harold in 1877.

Culture 
Rosalia batesi was featured as one of the insects in the video game Resident Evil in Insects Puzzle Room on 1st Floor of the Mansion.

Rosalia batesi was also featured as one of the collectable insects in the 2020 video game Animal Crossing: New Horizons.

It also appeared as a beetle saved by Doppio in Episode 26 the 2018 TV anime series JoJo's Bizarre Adventure: Golden Wind.

References

Compsocerini
Beetles described in 1877